Acrobasis glaucella is a moth of the family Pyralidae described by Otto Staudinger in 1859. It is found in most of Europe.

The wingspan is 19–23 mm. Adults are on wing from June to August.

The larvae feed on various oak species.

References

External links
 Fauna Europaea

Moths described in 1859
Acrobasis
Moths of Europe